A petrocalcic horizon is a diagnostic horizon in the USDA soil taxonomy (ST) and in the World Reference Base for Soil Resources (WRB). They are formed when secondary Calcium Carbonate or other carbonates accumulate in the subsoil to the extent that the soil becomes cemented into a hardpan. Petrocalcic horizons are similar to a duripan (ST – WRB: petroduric horizon) and a petrogypsic horizon (WRB) in how they affect land-use limitations. They can occur in conjunction with duripans where the conditions are right and there are enough free carbonates in the soil. Calcium Carbonates are found in alkaline soils, which are typical of arid and semiarid climates. A common field test for the presence of carbonates is application of hydrochloric acid to the soil, which indicates by fizzing and bubbling the presence of calcium carbonates.

Characteristics

The required characteristics of a petrocalcic horizon according to the Keys to USDA soil taxonomy, twelfth edition, 2014, are:

The horizon is cemented or indurated by carbonates, with or without silica or other cementing agents; and
Because of lateral continuity, roots can penetrate only along vertical fractures with a horizontal spacing of 10 cm or more; and
The horizon has a thickness of:
10 cm or more or
1 cm or more if it consists of a laminar cap directly underlain by bedrock.

Genesis

Petrocalcic horizons are typically found in older soils and are considered a mark of advanced soil evolution. Most petrocalcic formed before the Holocene age. They form in soil parent material that contains calcium carbonate or receive regular inputs of carbonates through dust. Carbonates are transported into the subsoil by water that precipitates the carbonates in the subsoil upon evaporation, eventually forming a massive, continuous layer of cemented carbonates. There is also some evidence that petrocalcic horizons can form "in situ" by alteration of limestone parent materials and alternating dissolution/precipitation of calcium carbonates.

See also

 USDA soil taxonomy
 World Reference Base for Soil Resources
 Duripan
 Fragipan
 Hardpan

References

 https://web.archive.org/web/20070610013420/https://www.soils.org/sssagloss/?check – Soil Science Society of America Soil Terms Glossary
 Soil Survey staff. 1999. Soil Taxonomy: A Basic System of Soil Classification for Making and Interpreting Soil Surveys. 2nd Edition. USDA-NRCS. Washington D.C.
 Soil Survey Staff: Keys to Soil Taxonomy. 12th edition. Natural Resources Conservation Service. U.S. Department of Agriculture. Washington D.C., USA, 2014.
 IUSS Working Group WRB: World Reference Base for Soil Resources 2014, Update 2015. World Soil Resources Reports 106, FAO, Rome 2015.  (PDF 2,3 MB).

External links
 Web Soil Survey, information on soils in specific areas of the United States

Pedology